Bacharach Park was a baseball park in Atlantic City, New Jersey. It was the home park of the Negro league Bacharach Giants from 1923 to 1927. Because the Bacharach Giants were the champions of the Eastern Colored League in 1926 and 1927, several games in the 1926 and 1927 Colored World Series were played at the park. From 1917 to 1921, the Bacharach Giants played as an independent team in Atlantic City at Inlet Park. From 1928 to 1929, they played home games at Atlantic Park Dog Track, a former dog racing track that was converted to a baseball park in 1928. The Bacharach Giants disbanded after the 1929 season, though a later incarnation of the team played in Philadelphia during the 1930s.

Bacharach Park
Bacharach Park was named for the Bacharach Giants baseball team, which in turn was named for Harry Bacharach, a former mayor of Atlantic City. The ballpark was bounded by North Tennessee Avenue (west, third base); Caspian Avenue (south, first base); North South Carolina Avenue (east, right field); and Magellan Avenue (north, left field). 

The grandstands seated 4,400 fans. Along the right field line, the fence was 270 feet from home plate, and right center was 365 feet. The left field line was 358 feet, and left center was 432 feet. In center field, the fence was 489 feet from home plate. Most of the recorded home runs hit at the park were hit to right field.

The Bacharach Giants used the park for home games from 1923 to 1927. As the champions of the Eastern Colored League in 1926, the team faced the Chicago American Giants and played three games in the 1926 Colored World Series there—the opening game on October 1, 1926 Game 2 on October 2, and Game 6 on October 6. Repeating as league champions the next season, they again faced the American Giants, and the last five games on the 1927 Colored World Series were played at Bacharach Park. In Game 5 played on October 8, 1927, Luther Farrell of the Bacharach Giants allowed no hits in a 7 inning game that was called early due to darkness. Games 6 through 9 were played there on October 10 through 13. The Bacharach Giants lost both series to the American Giants.

The site is currently the location of Carver Hall Apartments.

Inlet Park
Inlet Park was located at the corner of Parkside and N. New Hampshire Avenues, and was named for an earlier ballpark with the same name that was located across the street on the east side of N. New Hampshire Ave. The site is currently a parking lot for the Atlantic City Aquarium. The park was used by the Bacharach Giants, which were then an independent baseball team, from 1917 to 1921. In 1922 the team split, and two teams played under the Bacharach Giants name in different cities. When the Bacharach Giants returned to Atlantic City in 1923, home games were played at the new Bacharach Park, but Inlet Park was used as an alternate site for a game played by the Bacharach Giants on August 10, 1925.

The dimensions of Inlet Park were spacious, especially in left and center fields. The field measured 300 feet along the right field line, 384 feet to right center, 526 feet to center field, 429 feet to left center, and 372 feet down the left field line.

Atlantic Park Dog Track
Atlantic Park Dog Track was a dog racing track that was converted to a baseball park in 1928. It hosted the Bacharach Giants in the Eastern Colored League in 1928 and in the American Negro League in 1929. The team folded after the 1929 season, but the park was used as a neutral site for a game by the Baltimore Black Sox on August 26, 1933.

The venue was located at the northeast corner of N. North Carolina and Magellan Avenues, a location that is currently used as a parking lot and residences. To the north was a "proposed boulevard" which eventually became Brigantine Boulevard. N. Pennsylvania Avenue, which stopped at Magellan and would have bisected the race track, now goes through. The 1930 city directory listed "Bacharach Ball Park" as 800 N. North Carolina Ave, which locates to where Brigantine runs into North Carolina Avenue.

References

External links
Sanborn map showing first Inlet Park, 1906
Sanborn map showing ballpark, 1921
Sanborn map showing second Inlet Park, 1952
Outline of Bacharach Park on a 1924 map
Wider-angle source of the 1924 map, showing both Bacharach ballpark and dog track

Defunct sports venues in New Jersey
Defunct baseball venues in the United States
Negro league baseball venues
Demolished sports venues in New Jersey
Baseball venues in New Jersey
1923 establishments in New Jersey
Sports venues completed in 1923
Sports venues in Atlantic City, New Jersey